Ruy Diaz Melgarejo (Salteras 1519 – Santa Fe 1602) was a miner, military, conqueror and statesman who established the Spanish Crown in the region of Río de la Plata in South America. His life was marked by wars, conspiracies, persecutions and family conflicts.  Melgarejo enjoyed the favor of the Spanish crown. He almost absolutely ruled the independent province of Guayrá for 30 years.

Early troubles
Melgarejo left Italy on November 1, 1540, on an expedition led by Álvar Núñez Cabeza de Vaca to Río de la Plata.  He remained with de Vaca until, in 1544, he was removed from his position.  His protest against the crown's removal of his position led to his jailing.

In the late 1540s Melgarejo organized the election of his relative Diego de Abreu to the post of Governor of Asunción, deposing Fernando Mendoza, who had been appointed governor by de Vaca's deputy. De Abreu was recognized as governor, but Maelgarejo and de Abreu were forced to flee Asunción when de Abreu ordered Mendoza's death.  The two spent seven years in hiding before de Abreu was killed and Melgarejo was again jailed.

Melgarejo escaped from jail, but was captured by Tupi Indians who killed and ate his traveling companion.  He escaped captivity due to his forming a relationship with a female member of the tribe.  The two would leave the tribe and travel to San Vincente, where they were married.  Melgarejo, however, found his wife in the company of another lover.  After the discovery, Melgarejo killed them both, which again led to him fleeing.  In 1555, Melgarejo returned to Asunción, where he was welcomed by the current governor, his brother, Martinez de Irala.

Later successes
Melgarejo was active in establishing settlements along the Paraná River.  Melgarejo founded Villarrica in May 1570.  The name, translated as "rich town", was selected due to Melgarejo's belief that there were silver mines nearby.  He was later sent by de Irala to "conquer and settle" Guayrá.  Melgarejo was the leader of an expedition to Ontiveros, then capital of the region, a city founded three years earlier by another Irala lieutenant.  However, Melgarejo thought that the site was uninhabitable and abandoned it.  He instead created a new settlement, Ciudad Real, on higher ground across the Paraná River from the original Ontiveros site.

He was to be replaced as governor in 1570 by Alanzo Riguelme, but before Riguelme could take office his credentials were revoked and he was arrested.  Melgarejo was instructed to bring Riguelme and Felipe de Caceres back to Spain. They embarked in 1573. Bad weather early in the voyage forced them to stop at the port of San Vicente in Brazil, where Melgarejo was commissioned to assist the Governor in battles against natives.  His success in these battles led to his increased popularity with the government, which in turn led to increased opportunities to make additional expeditions to explore and settle the Paraguayan interior.  His successes in his naval commands and as a leader of settlement parties led to him becoming known as the "Invincible Captan."

References

Spanish explorers
1519 births
1602 deaths